The 2016 Rugby Europe Women’s U18 Sevens Championship was the third edition of the junior sevens tournament. France were hosts and also made their debut. Canada and the United States were invited; Initially, China and Japan were also invited, but withdrew from the competition and were replaced by Andorra and a local club, Romagnat. France won the tournament.

Teams 

 Romagnat

Pool stages

Pool A

Pool B

Pool C

Pool D

Finals

Shield

Bowl

Plate

Cup

Final standings

References 

2016–17 in European women's rugby union